Hibbertia linearis is a species of flowering plant in the family Dilleniaceae and is endemic to eastern Australia. It is a shrub with linear to oblong or egg-shaped leaves and yellow flowers with 15 to 25 stamens arranged around the three carpels.

Description
There are 15 to 25 stamens arranged around the three glabrous carpels. Flowering mainly occurs in spring and summer.

Taxonomy
Hibertia linearis was first formally described in 1817 by Augustin Pyramus de Candolle from an unpublished description by Robert Brown. De Candolle's description was published in his Regni Vegetabilis Systema Naturale.

In 1863, George Bentham described three variations of Hibbertia linearis and the names are accepted by the Australian Plant Census, but not by the National Herbarium of New South Wales:
 Hibbertia linearis var. floribunda Benth.;
 Hibbertia linearis var. grandiflora Benth.;
 Hibbertia linearis R.Br. ex DC. var. linearis.

Distribution and habitat
Hibbertia linearis grows in heath and forest on the coast and tablelands of Queensland and New South Wales as far south as the Victorian border.

References

linearis
Flora of New South Wales
Flora of Queensland
Taxa named by Augustin Pyramus de Candolle
Plants described in 1817